Santiago Fujimori Inomoto (born 3 December 1946) is a Peruvian lawyer, politician and a former congressman, representing Lima for the 2006–2011 term. Fujimori is of Japanese descent. He is the younger brother of former President Alberto Fujimori who was the President of Peru from 1990 until his downfall in 2000 and the uncle of Keiko Fujimori and Kenji Fujimori. During his brother's presidency, he served as an advisor.

Early life and education 
Fujimori graduated from the National University of San Marcos, where he earned a bachelor's degree in 1974 and a law degree in 1975.

Political career 
During his brother's presidency, he served as an advisor. He was involved in a case about an alleged irregular purchase of the Presidential Plane. When his brother's regime fell, he stayed away from politics.

In the 2006 election, he was elected Congressman, representing the city of Lima for the 2006–2011 term after getting 22,992 votes, in which he also ran unsuccessfully for First Vice President as the running mate of Martha Chávez under the Fujimorist Alliance for the Future coalition. He retired from politics after he lost his seat when he unsuccessfully ran for re-election in the 2011 elections under the Force 2011 party of his niece, Keiko, representing the Lima Region, but he was not elected.

Congressman (2006–2011)
As of August 3, 2006, the Board of Spokesperson of the Congress of the Republic, as well as the Multi-Party Board, which decides the organization of the different work commissions in Congress, appointed him as Coordinator of the Energy and Mines By tradition the coordinators later become Commission Chairs. He was president of the Energy and Mines Commission from August 11, 2006 to July 26, 2007. He was also president of the Foreign Relations Commission from August 14, 2008 to July 26, 2009, performing important work. In 2008, he was president of the Working Group in charge of systematizing national legislation (created by the Justice Commission of the Peruvian Congress). Between October 6, 2009 and July 26, 2011, he was the President of the Special Multiparty Commission in Charge of the Peruvian Legislative Order, which was elected unanimously.

References

Santiago
1946 births
Living people
People from Lima
Santiago
National University of San Marcos alumni
Fujimorista politicians
Members of the Congress of the Republic of Peru
Peruvian politicians of Japanese descent

21st-century Peruvian politicians